Muthana Khalid Al-Masloukhi (born June 14, 1989, in Iraq) is an Iraqi midfielder. Muthana Khalid currently plays with Al Shorta SC in Iraq, and for the Iraq national football team. He is combative holding midfielder playing in that position regularly for Iraq national team. In October 2013 Muthana signed for Northern giants Erbil after spending six successful years at jawiya.

National Team debut
In November 2009, Muthanna Khalid was called up for the friendly tournament in UAE. He made his first International debut against Azerbaijan national football team; Iraq won the match 1–0.

Honors

International
Iraq National football team
 2012 Arab Nations Cup Bronze medallist
 2012 WAFF Championship: runner-up
Iraq Military National football team
 2013 World Men's Military Cup: Champions

References

External links
 
 
 Player's profile on Goalzz.com
 Player's profile on soccerway

1989 births
Living people
Iraqi footballers
Iraq international footballers
Al-Quwa Al-Jawiya players
2011 AFC Asian Cup players
Al-Talaba SC players
Al-Shorta SC players
Association football midfielders